Fifth Third Center may refer to the following buildings:

 Fifth Third Center (Cincinnati)
 Fifth Third Center (Charlotte)
 Fifth Third Center (Chicago)
 Fifth Third Center (Cleveland)
 Fifth Third Center (Columbus)
 Fifth Third Center (Dayton)
 Fifth Third Center (Evansville)
 Fifth Third Center (Nashville)
 Fifth Third Center (Tampa)
 Fifth Third Center at One SeaGate